is an islet  from the shore near Izumo, Shimane, Japan. It is a nesting place for around 5,000 Black-tailed Gulls each Spring, and has been recognised as an Important Bird Area (IBA) by BirdLife International. The islet used to have a shrine  dedicated to Hinomisaki Jinja. Only the shrine priests were allowed to visit the island so the gulls settled virtually undisturbed.

References 

Islands of Shimane Prefecture
Islands of the Sea of Japan
Important Bird Areas of Japan
Seabird colonies